Sarah Lampard (born 7 July 1997) is an Australian rules footballer playing for the Melbourne Football Club in the AFL Women's competition. She was drafted by Melbourne with their seventeenth selection and 134th overall in the 2016 AFL Women's draft. She played every match in her debut season to finish with seven games.

Melbourne signed Lampard for the 2018 season during the trade period in May 2017.

References

External links 

1997 births
Living people
Melbourne Football Club (AFLW) players
Australian rules footballers from Victoria (Australia)
Victorian Women's Football League players